Raul Gainetdinov (born September 1, 1964) is a pharmacologist and neuroscientist. The main direction of his research is psychiatric and neurological diseases of the brain, such as schizophrenia, ADHD, depression and Parkinson's disease. He is the author of fundamental scientific works in pharmacology of dopamine, β-Arrestins and NMDA receptors. He is a pioneer researcher of Trace amine-associated receptors.

Education

He earned an MD degree from the Second Moscow Medical Institute (now the Russian National Research Medical University) in 1988, followed by a PhD degree in Pharmacology in 1992 from the Russian Academy of Medical Sciences.

Career

 1988-1996  PhD student - Senior Scientist, Institute of Pharmacology, Russian Academy of Medical Sciences, Moscow, Russia.
 1996-2008  Postdoctoral Researcher - Associate Research Professor, Department of Cell Biology, Duke University, North Carolina, USA.
 2008-2016  Senior Researcher, Department of Neuroscience and Brain Technologies, Italian Institute of Technology, Genova, Italy.
 2013-2018  Professor, Skolkovo Institute of Science and Technology
 Since 2015  Director of Institute of Translational Biomedicine and Head of Laboratory of Neuroscience and Molecular Pharmacology, Saint Petersburg State University.

Influence 
Since 2018 Raul Gainetdinov has been included in the Web of Science Highly Cited Researchers list. h-index 82.

Since 2013 he has been the chairman of the nomenclature committee for dopamine receptors of International Union of Basic and Clinical Pharmacology (IUPHAR).

Pictures

References

External links
PubMed search for Raul R. Gainetdinov

Living people
1964 births
Academic staff of Saint Petersburg State University
Russian medical researchers
Russian neuroscientists
Russian pharmacologists
Duke University faculty
Academicians of the Russian Academy of Medical Sciences